Edward Milton Chen (born January 20, 1953) is a Senior United States district judge of the United States District Court for the Northern District of California and former United States magistrate judge of the same court.

Early life and education 

Born and raised in Oakland, California, Chen earned an Artium Baccalaureus degree in 1975 from the University of California, Berkeley and a Juris Doctor from Boalt Hall School of Law in 1979.

Legal career 
After graduating law school, Chen clerked for Judge Charles Byron Renfrew of the United States District Court for the Northern District of California from June 1979 to April 1980 and Judge James R. Browning of the United States Court of Appeals for the Ninth Circuit from June 1981 to June 1982.

From 1982 until 1985, Chen served as an associate at the San Francisco law firm of Coblentz, Cahen, McCabe & Breyer. In September 1985, Chen became a staff attorney for the American Civil Liberties Union, specializing in language discrimination cases. He held that post until April 2001, when the judges on the United States District Court for the Northern District of California named Chen to an eight-year term as a
United States magistrate judge.

Federal judicial service

United States magistrate judge service 
Chen served as a United States Magistrate Judge from 2001 until 2011.

United States district judge service 
On August 7, 2009, President Barack Obama nominated Chen to a seat on the United States District Court for the Northern District of California vacated by the resignation of Martin Jenkins. On October 15, 2009, the Senate Judiciary Committee advanced his nomination by a 12–7 vote. On December 24, 2009, the U.S. Senate returned Chen's nomination to the president. Senator Feinstein in an interview published in the San Francisco Chronicle on December 29, 2009 reiterated her support for Judge Chen and her hope that the President would renominate Judge Chen for the U.S. District Court. President Obama renominated Chen in January 2010, and the Senate Judiciary Committee approved his nomination on February 4, 2010. On August 5, 2010, the U.S. Senate again returned Chen's nomination for failure to confirm him. President Obama renominated Chen to the seat on September 13, 2010 and again on January 5, 2011. On May 10, 2011, the United States Senate confirmed Chen by a 56–42 vote. He received his judicial commission on May 12, 2011. Since being confirmed as a District Judge, Chen has been a prolific writer, authoring a number of major opinions. According to one legal news source, Judge Chen is the 4th most-influential district judge appointed since 2010. The same source later named Judge Chen one of the "7 Rising Star Judges You Want to Clerk For." Chen assumed senior status on May 17, 2022.

Notable cases 
Chen's notable cases have included the civil trial regarding the shooting of Oscar Grant by a Bay Area Rapid Transit Police Department officer, the criminal prosecution of former Korn Ferry executive David Nosal for hacking, and a number of cases being brought against Uber regarding the classification of its drivers as independent contractors. On June 21, 2012, the case of Carreon v. Inman et al, which has achieved some prominence on the Internet, was assigned to Chen.

See also 
 Barack Obama judicial appointment controversies
 List of Asian American jurists
 List of first minority male lawyers and judges in California

References

External links 

1953 births
Living people
21st-century American judges
American jurists of Chinese descent
Judges of the United States District Court for the Northern District of California
Lawyers from Oakland, California
People from Marin County, California
United States district court judges appointed by Barack Obama
UC Berkeley School of Law alumni
United States magistrate judges